Marcelo Tolomeotti (born 10 December 1978), known as Marcelo Peabirú, is a Brazilian retired footballer who played as a forward.

Marcelo Peabirú previously played for Santos, and for Coritiba in the 2005 Campeonato Brasileiro.

External links

Marcelo Peabirú at playmakerstats.com (English version of ogol.com.br)

References

1978 births
Living people
Brazilian footballers
Santos FC players
Coritiba Foot Ball Club players
Valletta F.C. players
Association football forwards
União Esporte Clube players